Haloferax sulfurifontis is a species of archaea in the family Haloferacaceae.

References

External links

Halobacteria
Archaea described in 2004